The 1991 Derby City Council election took place on 2 May 1991 to elect members of Derby City Council in England. Local elections were held in the United Kingdom in 1991. This was on the same day as other local elections. 15 of the council's 44 seats were up for election. The council, which had previously been under Conservative council, fell under no overall control with the Conservatives and Labour holding exactly half the seats each.

Overall results

|-
| colspan=2 style="text-align: right; margin-right: 1em" | Total
| style="text-align: right;" | 15
| colspan=5 |
| style="text-align: right;" | 55,907
| style="text-align: right;" |

Ward results

Abbey

Babington

Chaddesden

Chellaston

Darley

Derwent

Kingsway

Litchurch

Littleover

Mackworth

Mickleover

Normanton

Osmanton

Sinfin

Spondon

References

1991 English local elections
May 1991 events in the United Kingdom
1991
1990s in Derbyshire